Hochstein Ridge is a ridge  long, extending north from Cotton Plateau between Prince Edward Glacier and Prince of Wales Glacier in the Queen Elizabeth Range of Antarctica. It was mapped by the United States Geological Survey from tellurometer surveys and Navy air photos, 1960–62, and was named by the Advisory Committee on Antarctic Names for Manfred Hochstein, a United States Antarctic Research Program glaciologist at Roosevelt Island, 1961–62, 1962–63 and 1963–64.

References

Ridges of Oates Land